Mnemosyne (named for the Greek goddess of memory, Mnemosyne) is a line of spaced repetition software developed since 2003. Spaced repetition is an evidence-based learning technique that has been shown to increase the rate of memorization.

Features
 Spacing algorithm based on an early version of the SuperMemo algorithm, SM-2, with some modifications that deal with early and late repetitions.
 Supports pictures, sound, video, HTML, Flash and LaTeX
 Portable (can be installed on a USB stick)
 Categorization of cards
 Learning progress statistics
 Stores learning data (represented as decks of cards that each have a question and an answer side) in ".mem" database files, which are interoperable with a number of other spaced repetition applications
 Plugins and JavaScript support
 Review cards on Android devices.
 Synchronization between other machines

Overview 
Each day, the software displays each card that is scheduled for repetition. The user then grades their recollection of the card's answer on a scale of 0–5. The software then schedules the next repetition of the card in accordance with the user's rating of that particular card and the database of cards as a whole. This produces an active, rather than passive, review process. The rationale behind this approach is that (because of the spacing effect), over time, the number of repetitions done per day is reduced, increasing the rate of recall (when compared to passive learning techniques), with minimal time spent learning.

Software
A client program for review on Android devices is also available but needs to be synchronized by the desktop program. Users of the software usually make their own database of cards, although pre-made Mnemosyne databases are available, and it is possible to import SuperMemo collections and text files. SQLite is used by the program to store files. Imports of flashcard databases from Anki, as well as databases from older versions of Mnemosyne are possible.

Research
Mnemosyne collects data from volunteering users and is a research project on long-term memory.

An August 2009 version of the dataset was made available via BitTorrent; a January 2014 version is available for download. Otherwise, the latest version is available from the author, Peter Bienstman, upon request.

See also

 Anki
 List of flashcard software

References

External links

Mnemosyne project website
Review of Mnemosyne and comparison with Anki and SuperMemo (Q1-Q2 2008)
Review of Mnemosyne at foolsworkshop.com
Review of Mnemosyne and comparison with Anki (Q1 2009)

2003 software
Free software programmed in Python
Free educational software
Spaced repetition software
Educational software that uses Qt
Software using the GNU AGPL license
Software using the LGPL license